= Moumoustra =

Town of ancient Cilicia

Coordinates: 37°12′54″N 35°57′27″E

Moumoustra was a town of ancient Cilicia, inhabited during Byzantine times.

Its site is located near Mecidiye in Asiatic Turkey.
